Saratha A. Goggins (born 1950/51) is an American politician who served as the first woman mayor of East Cleveland, Ohio.

Biography
Goggins was a long-time member of the East Cleveland City Council eventually serving as its president. On September 1, 2004, she was sworn in as mayor of East Cleveland after the resignation of her predecessor who was convicted of racketeering, extortion, mail fraud, and tax evasion, making her the first female and 4th African-American mayor of East Cleveland.
 
In the October 2005 primary election, running as a Democrat, she was defeated by Eric J. Brewer who earned 54.90% of the vote to her 29.96% after news broke that she had been convicted in May 1983 of voluntary manslaughter in the stabbing to death her boyfriend on September 30, 1982. She stated that the stabbing was in self-defense.

References

1950s births
Living people
African-American mayors in Ohio
Mayors of places in Ohio
Mayors of East Cleveland, Ohio
21st-century African-American people
20th-century African-American people
African-American women mayors